Evangelische Lutherische Emanuels Kirche, also known as Emmanuel Evangelical Lutheran Church and Hill Church, is a historic Lutheran church complex and national historic district located near Dubois in Harbison Township, Dubois County, Indiana.  The main church was built in 1901, and is a one-story, rectangular High Victorian Gothic style frame building.  It has a front gable roof and rests on a stone foundation. It features a large steeple structure consisting of a square tower, octagonal drum, and spire. Also on the property are the contributing cemetery, schoolhouse (1889), and parsonage (1891).

It was added to the National Register of Historic Places in 1990.

Gallery

References

External links

Lutheran churches in Indiana
Churches on the National Register of Historic Places in Indiana
Historic districts on the National Register of Historic Places in Indiana
Italianate architecture in Indiana
Gothic Revival architecture in Indiana
Churches completed in 1901
Churches in Dubois County, Indiana
National Register of Historic Places in Dubois County, Indiana